Bump or Bumps is a nickname for:

 Robert Blackwell (1918–1985), American bandleader, songwriter, arranger and record producer nicknamed "Bumps"
 Bump Elliott (1925–2019), American college football player, coach, and athletic administrator
 Bump Hadley (1904–1963), American Major League Baseball pitcher
 Bump Wills (born 1952), American Major League Baseball second basemen

See also 

 
 

Lists of people by nickname